Karen Marie LaFace (born January 29, 1966, in Pittsburgh, Pennsylvania) is a retired female diver from the United States.

She competed for the US at the 1992 Summer Olympics, finishing in ninth place in the Women's 3m Springboard event. LaFace won the gold medal in the same event a year earlier at the 1991 Pan American Games.

LaFace was state diving champion in high school at the PIAA (Pennsylvania) Meet and competed in the National Sports Festival in Indianapolis, Indiana, in the early 1980s.

References 

1966 births
Living people
Divers at the 1992 Summer Olympics
Olympic divers of the United States
Sportspeople from Pittsburgh
American female divers
Pan American Games gold medalists for the United States
Pan American Games medalists in diving
Divers at the 1991 Pan American Games
Medalists at the 1991 Pan American Games
21st-century American women